The Acantholipini are a tribe of moths in the family Erebidae.

Genera

Acantholipes
Hypospila
Tochara
Ugia
Ugiodes

References

 , 2010: Noctidae of the Socotra Archipelago (Yemen) with notes on the fauna of the southern Arabian Peninsula (Lepidoptera: Noctuoidea). Esperiana Buchreihe zu Entomologie Memoir 5: 172-241.

 
Erebinae
Moth tribes